Stroud is a constituency represented in the House of Commons of the UK Parliament. It is held by Siobhan Baillie of the Conservative Party. Formerly a safe Conservative seat, Stroud has been a marginal seat since 1992, changing hands four times in seven elections since then.

History 
The seat's parliamentary borough forerunner was created by the First Reform Act for the 1832 general election.  It elected two MPs using the bloc vote until transformed in the Redistribution of Seats Act 1885 for that year's general election, the name being transferred to a single-seat county division which covered a wider zone.

This was abolished at the 1950 general election, chiefly replaced with a new seat, Stroud and Thornbury. That was in turn abolished at the 1955 general election, when the present entity was created.  Since this recreation the seat has had boundary changes.

Boundaries 

1955–1974: The Urban Districts of Nailsworth and Stroud, the Rural Districts of Dursley, Stroud, and Tetbury, and part of the Rural District of Gloucester.

1974–1983: The Urban Districts of Nailsworth and Stroud, the Rural Districts of Dursley, Stroud, and Tetbury, and in the Rural District of Gloucester the parishes of Arlingham, Brookthorpe with Whaddon, Eastington, Elmore, Frampton on Severn, Fretherne with Saul, Frocester, Hardwicke, Harescombe, Haresfield, Longney, Moreton Valence, Quedgeley, Standish, Upton St Leonards, and Whitminster.

1983–1997: The District of Stroud wards of Berkeley, Bisley, Cainscross, Cam, Cambridge, Central, Chalford, Dursley, Eastington, Hinton, King's Stanley, Leonard Stanley, Minchinhampton, Nailsworth, Nibley, Painswick, Parklands, Randwick, Rodborough, Severn, Stonehouse, Thrupp, Trinity, Uley, Uplands, Vale, Whiteshill, Woodfield, and Wotton and Kingswood, and the District of Cotswold wards of Avening, Grumbold's Ash, and Tetbury.

1997–2010: All the wards of the District of Stroud except the Wotton and Kingswood ward.

2010–present: The District of Stroud wards of Amberley and Woodchester, Berkeley, Bisley, Cainscross, Cam East, Cam West, Central, Chalford, Coaley and Uley, Dursley, Eastington and Standish, Farmhill and Paganhill, Hardwicke, Nailsworth, Over Stroud, Painswick, Rodborough, Severn, Slade, Stonehouse, The Stanleys, Thrupp, Trinity, Uplands, Upton St Leonards, Vale, and Valley.

The seat is 24 of the 27 wards of Stroud district (the rest are in The Cotswolds seat).  The north-west limit is the Severn, which meanders from Gloucester as the upper estuary.

Constituency profile 
Stroud lies south of Gloucester, between the two larger Gloucestershire constituencies of The Cotswolds and Forest of Dean. Its east climbs the Cotswold Hills but Stroud is both smaller and more industrialised than east and west neighbours.

Most of the seat is rural or semi-rural with a middle belt that has a group of urbanised villages, including Caincross, Cam and Rodborough, with the main towns part of the West Country textile manufacturing heritage. The major market towns include Stroud itself, Dursley in the south, and the smaller towns of Berkeley (which has a smaller electorate than Chalford, but more facilities), Stonehouse and Nailsworth.

In November 2012, unemployment was 2.1%, compared to the national average of 3.8%.

Members of Parliament

Stroud parliamentary borough

MPs 1832–1885

Stroud division of Gloucestershire

MPs 1885–1950

Stroud County Constituency

MPs since 1955

Elections

Elections in the 2010s

Elections in the 2000s

Elections in the 1990s

Elections in the 1980s

Elections in the 1970s

Elections in the 1960s

Elections in the 1950s

Election in the 1940s 

General Election 1939–40:

Another general election was required to take place before the end of 1940. The political parties had been making preparations for an election to take place from 1939 and by the end of this year, the following candidates had been selected; 
Conservative: Walter Perkins

Elections in the 1930s

Elections in the 1920s

Elections 1832 to 1918

Elections in the 1910s 

General Election 1914–15:

Another General Election was required to take place before the end of 1915. The political parties had been making preparations for an election to take place and by July 1914, the following candidates had been selected: 
Liberal: George Hardy
Unionist: Cecil Edwin Fitch

Elections in the 1900s

Elections in the 1890s

Elections in the 1880s

Elections in the 1870s

 Caused by the previous by-election being declared void on petition.

 Caused by Dorington's election being declared void on petition, due to "bribery, treating, and undue influence".

 
 

 Caused by the election being declared void on petition on "account of treating, but the treating was not with knowledge of the candidates".

 

 

 

 Caused by Winterbotham's death.

Elections in the 1860s

 
 

 
 

 Caused by Scrope's resignation.

Elections in the 1850s 

 Caused by the appointment of Horsman as Chief Secretary to the Lord Lieutenant of Ireland

 Caused by Reynolds-Moreton's elevation to the peerage, becoming 3rd Earl Ducie

Elections in the 1840s 

 

J Symons, formerly Editor of the Stroud Free Press, was a candidate but withdrew before the election took place.
The Gloucester Journal described him as "A Chartist of Nailsworth by name Chapman who has issued his address couched in flaming terms worthy of the Northern Star (goes on to comment that he was a small publican and tailor".

Elections in the 1830s 

 

Resignation of Fox

Resignation of Ricardo

See also 
 List of parliamentary constituencies in Gloucestershire
 Opinion polling for the next United Kingdom general election in individual constituencies

Notes

References

Sources
Craig, F. W. S. (1983). British parliamentary election results 1918-1949 (3 ed.). Chichester: Parliamentary Research Services. .

Parliamentary constituencies in South West England
Politics of Gloucestershire
Stroud District
Constituencies of the Parliament of the United Kingdom established in 1832
Constituencies of the Parliament of the United Kingdom disestablished in 1950
Constituencies of the Parliament of the United Kingdom established in 1955